Leave It to Bryan is a Canadian home renovation reality series hosted by contractor Bryan Baeumler, which premiered in January 2012 on HGTV.

The show is based around the concept that the renovations most desired by a homeowner aren't necessarily always the ones most urgently needed in the home. Baeumler has described the series as inspired by various past clients who wanted big-ticket renovations, such as kitchen or bathroom upgrades or home theatre spaces, while neglecting or even being entirely unaware of structural deficiencies that were much more critical to the value of their home, or even to their basic physical health and safety. He has suggested in interviews that this issue has become so common that many North American cities will face a major housing crisis within 15 to 20 years, as an increasing number of homes risk becoming entirely uninhabitable, if homeowners continue to emphasize lifestyle luxuries over basic structural improvements.

Episodes typically revolve around homeowners who may not realize that they have neglected a critical structural issue, couples who disagree on which renovation should be the immediate priority within their renovation budget, or other situations where the homeowners' wants and needs may be in conflict. In each episode, Baeumler meets with the homeowner to identify the desired renovation, while also assessing the home to identify whether another renovation is more critical; he subsequently returns to the home and begins the renovation he has identified as the most immediate requirement, and the homeowners only learn which project he has actually chosen after the renovation is already underway. The show is produced by Si Entertainment in Toronto and the GTA.

Production was indefinitely suspended with the start of Bryan Inc.

Episodes

Season 1 (2012)

Season 2 (2012)

Season 3 (2013–14)

Season 4 (2014–15)

Season 5 (2015)

Season 6 (2016)

Season 7 (2017)

References

External links
 Leave It to Bryan

2012 Canadian television series debuts
HGTV (Canada) original programming
Television series by Corus Entertainment
2010s Canadian reality television series
Bryan Baeumler television franchise
English-language television shows